Eugeniusz Cebrat (born 25 February 1955) is a Polish football goalkeeper. Born in Mysłowice, his career started in a local team of Gornik Wesola. In 1971, he moved to GKS Tychy, where in 1976 he became vice-champion of Poland. After several years in Tychy, in 1983 he moved to Górnik Zabrze, where he twice was champion of Poland (1985, 1986). Later he played for German FC Gütersloh and, after returning to Poland, in Stal Stalowa Wola. He also played 6 games in the Poland national team.

References

External links
 

1955 births
Living people
Polish footballers
Association football goalkeepers
Śląsk Wrocław players
Górnik Zabrze players
Expatriate footballers in Germany
FC Gütersloh 2000 players
People from Mysłowice
Sportspeople from Silesian Voivodeship
German footballers needing infoboxes
Poland international footballers